Always-already is a philosophical term regarding the perception of phenomena by the mind of an observer. The features of a phenomenon that seem to precede any perception of it are said to be "always already" present.

Development
"Always already" literally translates the German phrase immer schon that appears prominently in several 20th century philosophical works, notably Martin Heidegger's Being and Time. The phrase is not specific to philosophy in German, but refers to an action or condition that has continued without any identifiable beginning. Heidegger used the phrase routinely to indicate that Dasein, the human experience of existence, has no beginning apart from the world in which one exists, but is produced in it and by it.

Heidegger's influence allowed French and subsequent English thinkers to accept the phrase's literal translation. In the Marxist tradition, Louis Althusser observed that "individuals are always-already subjects" within an ideological structure before they perceive themselves as such—indeed, even before birth. During the late 20th century the term spread into various areas of philosophical discourse that include literary theory, hermeneutics and deconstruction.

See also 
 A priori and a posteriori
 Hauntology
 Noumenon
 Facticity
 Thrownness

References

 Tore Langholz, Das Problem des »immer schon« in Derridas Schriftphilosophie, Vienna 2016: Passagen.

A priori
Concepts in aesthetics
Concepts in epistemology
Concepts in logic
Concepts in metaphysics
Concepts in the philosophy of mind
Continental philosophy
Deconstruction
Epistemological theories
Existentialism
Existentialist concepts
German philosophy
Hermeneutics
Interpretation (philosophy)
Literary theory
Martin Heidegger
Metaphysical theories
Ontology
Perception
Phenomenology
Post-structuralism